Jonne Kemppinen (born 25 August 1981) is a Finnish former professional footballer. He played 168 games for FC Lahti.

Career
Kemppinen progressed through the youth teams of Kuusysi before making his senior debut as part of FC Lahti in February 2002 in a pre-season friendly against HJK Helsinki, scoring with his first touch. His first competitive appearance followed six months later in a Veikkausliiga game against AC Allianssi, coming off the bench for Heikki Haara. The following season, he scored his first professional goal in a match against FC Jazz.

He became the top goalscorer of Lahti in the 2011 Ykkönen season alongside Drilon Shala with 17 goals each, as the club won promotion to the Veikkausliiga. To date, he holds the record for most goals scored in a single match for Lahti, scoring five against Helsingin Ponnistus.

In July 2013, Kemppinen suffered a knee injury which required surgery. He decided to retire from professional football shortly after.

Honours
Lahti
 Ykkönen: 2011
 Finnish League Cup: 2007, 2013

References

External links
Jonne Kemppinen at Guardian Football
Hall of Fame at Veikkausliiga

1981 births
Living people
Sportspeople from Lahti
Finnish footballers
Association football forwards
FC Kuusysi players
FC Lahti players
FC Hämeenlinna players
Veikkausliiga players
Ykkönen players